Dam Chenar may refer to:
 Dam Chenar-e Azizi
 Dam Chenar-e Hadiabad